The fifth season of the Brazilian competitive reality television series MasterChef premiered on March 6, 2018, at 10:30 p.m. on Band.

Sommelier Maria Antônia Russi won the competition over dentist Hugo Merchan on July 31, 2018.

Contestants

Top 21

Elimination table

Notes

Key

Ratings and reception

Brazilian ratings
All numbers are in points and provided by Kantar Ibope Media.

References

External links
 MasterChef on Band

2018 Brazilian television seasons
MasterChef (Brazilian TV series)